Frank Allen FRSC CChem (1944 – 2014) was an internationally recognised crystallographer.

He gained a First in chemistry and a PhD in crystallography at Imperial College London, and in 1968 moved to Vancouver to take up a post-doctoral fellowship. In 1970 he began working at the newly established Cambridge Crystallographic Data Centre, becoming Scientific Director and then Executive Director before retiring in 2008 and taking on the role of Emeritus Research Fellow.

He was a member of the editorial board for Springer Publishing's Structural Chemistry journal.

References

Alumni of Imperial College London
British chemists
Fellows of the Royal Society of Chemistry
1944 births
Place of birth missing
2014 deaths
Place of death missing